During 1970-71 season Inter competed in Serie A, Coppa Italia and Fairs' Cup.

Summary 
Following the golden era of the 1960s, Inter managed to win their eleventh league title in 1971.
The second season of Heriberto Herrera is opened with the transfer out of Luis Suárez to Sampdoria, after nine years in Milan. The fans of Inter Milan were shocked with initial results, with Inter out in Coppa Italia and eliminated by Newcastle United in Fairs Cup.

President Ivanoe Fraizzoli, who at the time also made it clear that he was willing to sell the club if the right offer was tabled, fired Herrera after a 0-3 loss with city rivals Milan and handed control of the side to youth team boss Giovanni Invernizzi. A former Inter player, Invernizzi was initially appointed on a temporary basis yet ended the campaign by making Italian football history.

Invernizzi rejuvenated a tactically exhausted and an under-performing squad. He turned Tarcisio Burgnich into a sweeper, played the young Mauro Bellugi at right-back, reintegrated Jair into the team, replaced summer signing Mario Frustalupi with Mario Bertini and asked the club's senators – Giacinto Facchetti, Sandro Mazzola, Mario Corso and Boninsegna – to perform to their status.

The turning point in their season came after a defeat to Napoli in Week 7. On the flight home, Invernizzi and some of the side's more experienced elements sat down with a fixture list to hand. Together they plotted their path to what many perceived as unlikely title glory and the tabella, as it was known, became part of Inter folklore.

Following defeat at the San Paolo, they went on an unbeaten run which saw them take 21 points from a possible 24. The Nerazzurri won the return derby, wiped out a significant point gap that winter champions Milan had over them and netted the championship with two games to spare.

Invernizzi not only became a hero of consequence, he also made sure his name would be inscribed in the footballing annals of time. Never before and not since has a Serie A team changed Coach mid-season and gone on to be crowned champions of Italy.

Squad

Transfers 
Source:

Competitions

Serie A

League table

Matches

Coppa Italia

First round

Group 3

Fairs Cup

First round

Statistics

References

See also 

Inter Milan seasons
Inter Milan
Italian football championship-winning seasons